Manuel Schwenk (born 7 March 1992), previously known as Manuel Janzer until 2019, is a German professional footballer who plays as a midfielder for Holstein Kiel II.

Personal life
Schwenk was born Aalen, Baden-Württemberg with the name Manuel Janzer. He was married in May 2019, and adopted his wife's surname of Schwenk.

References

External links
 
 

1992 births
Living people
Association football midfielders
German footballers
VfB Stuttgart II players
1. FC Heidenheim players
Holstein Kiel players
Eintracht Braunschweig players
3. Liga players
2. Bundesliga players
People from Aalen
Sportspeople from Stuttgart (region)
Footballers from Baden-Württemberg